George Louis may refer to:

 George Louis, Prince of Nassau-Dillenburg (1618–1656)
 George Louis I, Count of Erbach-Erbach (1643–1693)
 George I of Great Britain (1660–1727), born Georg Ludwig or George Louis
 George Louis, Landgrave of Hesse-Darmstadt or Prince George of Hesse-Darmstadt (1669–1705)
 George Louis, Prince of Erbach-Schönberg (1903–1971)

See also
 George Lewis (disambiguation)